The Saratoga Dew Stakes is an American Thoroughbred horse race held annually at the end of August at Saratoga Race Course in Saratoga Springs, New York. Restricted to New York bred  fillies and Mares, age three or older, it is contested on dirt over a distance of one and one eight miles (9 furlongs).

Inaugurated in 2004, the race is named for the New York bred filly, Saratoga Dew, a multiple Grade 1 winner on NYRA tracks who was voted the 1992 Eclipse Award as the American Champion Three-Year-Old Filly. The race was later renamed the Johnstone Mile.

Records
Speed record:
 1.49:87 - Hot Stones (2015)

Most wins:
 2 - Judy Soda (2005, 2006)
 2 - Go Unbridled (2012, 2013)

Most wins by a jockey:
 3 - Junior Alvarado (2012, 2013, 2018)
 2 - Edgar Prado (2005, 2007)
 2 - Rajiv Maragh (2009, 2014)
 2 - John Velazquez (2008, 2015)

Most wins by a trainer:
 3 - Thomas M. Bush (2004, 2005, 2006)
 3 - Rudy R. Rodriguez (2016, 2017, 2018)

Most wins by an owner:
 3 - Michael Dubb (2016, 2017, 2021)

Winners

References
 The Saratioga Dew stakes history at NYBreds.com
Saratoga Dew Stakes Results at Pedigree Query

Ungraded stakes races in the United States
Horse races in New York (state)
Mile category horse races for fillies and mares
Recurring events established in 2004
Saratoga Race Course
2004 establishments in New York (state)